The 2002–03 First League of the Federation of Bosnia and Herzegovina season was the third since its establishment.

Clubs and stadiums

League standings

First League of the Federation of Bosnia and Herzegovina seasons
Bosnia
2002–03 in Bosnia and Herzegovina football